Johnny Kidd & the Pirates (known simply as The Pirates after their reunion) were an English rock band led by singer/songwriter Johnny Kidd. They scored numerous hit songs from the late 1950s to the early 1960s, including "Shakin' All Over" and "Please Don't Touch".

Their stage act was theatrical, including wearing full pirate costumes, echoing their rock 'n' roll contemporaries such as Screaming Lord Sutch & the Savages and Nero and the Gladiators. The group disbanded after Kidd's sudden death in an automobile accident, but former members of the band reunited as The Pirates and continued performing until the late 2000's.

Early days
The original group came under the management of Guy Robinson and was signed to HMV in 1959 under the auspices of producer Walter J. Ridley. Their first single was the raw "Please Don't Touch", penned by Kidd. This became a minor hit reaching number 25 on the UK singles charts in 1959. The song has been covered many times since, most successfully by the team of Motörhead and Girlschool known as Headgirl.

When the group appeared on Saturday Club between 1959 and 1961, Mike West and Tom Brown shared the vocals with Kidd.

"Shakin' All Over"
Kidd and the Pirates' most famous song was "Shakin' All Over", memorable for opening guitars and solo from Joe Moretti, it reached number one in the UK singles charts in 1960. The song and the group's proto-power trio line-up both made a strong impression on the Who, who would cover it in their 1970 album Live at Leeds, whose CD liner notes proclaim the original to be the UK's best pre-Beatles rock single. Canada's The Guess Who reached No. 1 in their home country and skirted the US Top 20 with a cover version in early 1965. 

The swansong recording of this line-up in 1961, "Please Don't Bring Me Down" failed to chart. However, it featured a B-side which turned out to be a minor UK rock 'n' roll classic. "So What" featured a piano solo from Morgan "Thunderclap" Jones. When the single failed to chart, the Pirates—Clem Cattini, Alan Caddy and Brian Gregg – decided to jump ship and joined Colin Hicks as his "Cabinboys" on a 6-week tour to Europe.  After this liaison ended, Cattini and Caddy joined a Joe Meek backing band who evolved into the Tornados. Kidd meanwhile cut a "solo" single backed by a bigger band sound. "Hurry on Back to Love" was more bluesy than anything Kidd had previously attempted and indicated a possible new musical path.

A new Pirate trio was recruited. Johnny Spence (bass), Frank Farley (drums) and Johnny Patto (lead guitar), had recently backed Cuddly Dudley as "The Redcaps". Patto soon left and was replaced by Mick Green (lead guitar), who had also backed Dudley. The new line-up's first single with Kidd, "A Shot Of Rhythm And Blues" (coupled with "I Can Tell") managed to break Kidd's dry spell, entering the lower reaches of the chart toward the end of 1962. In retrospect this disc, which debuted Green's unique playing style incorporating alternating lead and rhythm guitar figures, can be viewed as the sonic bridge marking the transition of British rock and roll into British beat.

Over time, Kidd developed a visual show. The group would deck out in 19th century pirate costume in front of a huge backcloth of a pirate galleon, with Kidd toying with a cutlass. A projected single in keeping with the new sound, "Some Other Guy" was left unreleased in early 1963 allowing The Big Three to score their first chart entry. The explosive rise of the 'beat groups' in 1963 outshone the slow-burning R&B scene; without a single release Kidd and his Pirates were losing valuable momentum on the chart front.

Kidd responded by recording Gordon Mills' "I'll Never Get Over You", originally a Buddy Holly styled B-side issued by Mills' erstwhile group The Viscounts and reaching number 4 on the UK chart in the summer of 1963. The follow-up, "Hungry For Love", was also written by Mills and broke into the top twenty during the autumn, fending off a competing EP version by The Searchers. The "Hungry For Love" recording session was very productive, also yielding a Pirates-only single. Both sides, "My Babe" and "Casting My Spell" featuring Spence on vocals were recorded in one take each, a sign of this Pirates line-up's power, ability and confidence. According to Mick Green, this single was issued to test the waters whether Kidd and the Pirates could be split into two successful acts; however, the single was not a hit, which put a stop to any further experiments on this front.

The later days
In 1964, the Pirates added organist Vic Cooper to their line-up. The hits again tailed away and the long-awaited debut album, featuring the expanded line-up with Vic Cooper on organ/piano duties, was never mastered for release. One step behind the Beatles and losing ground, Kidd abandoned dual-tracking his powerful voice and switched back to R&B where his vocal strengths lay.  After 1964's "Always And Ever" (based on “Santa Lucia”), Mick Green left during the summer season at Blackpool and joined Billy J. Kramer and the Dakotas.  The Tornadoes were on the same bill in Blackpool, so their guitarist Stuart Taylor filled in until Kidd found John Weider, a fan of Green's, to come aboard.

Eventually the group parted company with Kidd. Johnny Spence, Frank Farley and guitarist Jon Morshead (who replaced Weider) continued as The Pirates (keeping the name with Kidd's blessing) and recorded one single, "Shades of Blue" for Polydor before a lack of success calling it a day in mid-1966.  Kidd, meanwhile, kept recording and gigging with an anonymous group of backing musicians. His penultimate single "It's Got To Be You", and an unreleased version of Otis Redding's "I Can't Turn You Loose", showed that a mix of R&B and soul may have been where his future musical path lay.

In 1966, one of the anonymous musicians, organist Ray Soaper contacted some mates.  Mick Stewart (lead guitar), Nick Simper (bass) and Roger Truth (drums) came together with Soper and presented themselves to Kidd as his new Pirates.  With his newly christened "New Pirates" (necessarily distinguishing them from the other "Pirates"), a revitalised Kidd worked towards a comeback to the point he spoke about the possibility of recording a new album.  On returning from a cancelled gig at the Imperial in Bolton, he was killed in a car accident near Bury, Lancashire, on 7 October 1966, with companion Nick Simper being injured.

The group had a new single.  "Send For That Girl", (coupled with a version of the Lee Hazlewood-written "The Fool"), which was released posthumously in November but failed to chart.  This line-up of the Pirates (with John Kerrison replacing Truth at late notice) carried on in tribute once Simper had recovered, though there were no further recordings.  As the pop scene changed and bookings became harder to obtain, the group split in May 1967.

Post-Kidd – The Pirates
The best-known line-up of the Pirates, and also the only line-up ever given Johnny Kidd's blessing to retain and to record under the name "The Pirates" (Mick Green, Johnny Spence and Frank Farley) reformed in 1976. They released four albums; Out of Their Skulls (1977), reaching number 57 in the UK Albums Chart, Skull Wars (1978), Happy Birthday Rock'n'Roll (1979) and A Fistful of Dubloons (1981). Some original songs, but mostly R’n’R/R&B classics. Out of Their Skulls and Skull Wars featured a mixture of live and studio tracks.

They played at 'Front Row Festival', a three-week event at the Hope and Anchor, Islington in late 1977, which resulted in the band's inclusion, alongside Wilko Johnson, The Only Ones, the Saints, the Stranglers, X-Ray Spex, and XTC, on a hit double album of recordings from the festival. The Hope & Anchor Front Row Festival compilation LP (1978) reached number 28 in the UK Albums Chart. The original line-up featuring Spence, Green and Farley also had two tracks on each of compilation albums It’s Rock’n’Roll (1977) and The London R & B Sessions (1980). 

This line-up did its final gig in 1983 (until reforming for the third time in 1999, releasing Live In Japan 2000 (2002)). After 1983 The Pirates kept going on every now and then with many various lines-up, always including Mick Green, in the 1980s and early 1990s with John Gustafson (The Big Three, Roxy Music) on bass and vocals with various different drummers. Then in 1996–1998 with Björn Anders (bass/vocals) and Romek Parol (drums), before reforming with the Green, Spence and Farley line-up in 1999, which continued to perform until 2005. Due to ill-health Frank Farley retired from the live circuit in 2005, to be replaced by Mike Roberts. With Mike Roberts Johnny Spence and Mick Green, they continued a few more years.

Since the break-up in 1983 albums were mostly made under the name Pirates with various line-ups, such as Still Shakin''' (1987) with John Gustafson playing bass and taking care of vocal duties, Land of the Blind with the Green-Anders-Parol line-up,[9] which was released in 1998,[10] and Skullduggery by the Green, Spence and Roberts line-up in 2006,[11] The band dissolved on the death of Mick Green in January 2010.

Since then Anders and Parol have formed a new band, The Spellkasters, in 2013 with new frontman Pete Edmunds. An album Kastin' The Spell was recorded in Anders' Swedish studio for release on Angel Air Records in February 2014. The album contains new versions of Pirates tracks, "Gibson Martin Fender", "Don't Munchen It" and "Going Back Home", that Mick Green co-wrote with Wilko Johnson. The Spellkasters started a worldwide tour schedule in March 2014.

Original bass player, and vocalist of the Pirates trio, Johnny Spence is still touring and recording, with a Finnish rock and roll and rhythm & blues-trio Doctor's Order. Their co-operation started in 2008, most of the concerts and tours have been in Finland, but they also performed at the International Gastro Blues Festival in Hungary in 2012. Johnny Spence and Doctor's Order have made two albums, Full Throttle No Brakes (2009) and Hot and Rockin' (2011), both on Goofin' Records label. Mick Green also recorded a six track mini-album Cutthroat and Dangerous'' with Doctor's Order, which was released in 2007, also on Goofin' Records.

Another set of Pirates, with Joe Moretti (guitar), and re-uniting original Pirates, Brian Gregg (bass) and Clem Cattini (drums), has also played occasional gigs in recent years. Moretti played on "Shakin' All Over" and its follow-up "Restless". However, in this Pirates line-up it is Joe Moretti's son, also called Joe Moretti, on guitar.

Legacy
The B-side of Johnny Kidd & the Pirates' 1964 single "Always and Ever" was a cover of "Dr Feelgood" by the American blues pianist and singer Willie Perryman (also known as "Piano Red"), who recorded the song as "Dr Feelgood & the Interns". The name of the song is slang for heroin. The band Dr. Feelgood took their name from the Johnny Kidd & the Pirates recording.

Former members
 Johnny Kidd (Frederick Heath) – vocals (1959–66; his death)
 Alan Caddy – lead guitar (1959–61; died 2000)
 Brian Gregg – bass (1959–61)
 Clem Cattini – drums (1959–61)
 Mike West – backing vocals (1959)
 Tom Brown – backing vocals (1959)
 Frank Farley – drums (1961–66; 1976–2005)
 Johnny Spence – bass (1961–66, 1976–2010)
 Johnny Patto – guitar (1962)
 Mick Green – guitar (1962–64; 1976–2010; his death)
 Vic Cooper – piano/organ (1964–66)
 John Weider – guitar (1964–65)
 John Moreshead – guitar (1965–66)
 Paulie Raymond – guitar (1966–67)
 Mick Stewart – guitar/vocals (1966–67)
 Roger "Truth" Pinner – drums (1966)
 Ray Soper – piano/organ (1966)
 Nick Simper – bass/vocals (1966–67)
 Johnny Carroll – keyboards/vocals (1966–67; died 1995)
 John Kerrison – drums (1966–67)
 BJ Anders – bass/vocals (1994–99)
 Romek Parol – drums (1994–99)
 Mike Roberts – drums (2005–10)
 Mike Rudzinski – bass/vocals (1966)
 Billy Knaggs – guitar (1966)
 Les Hall – drums (1966)
 John Gustafson – bass/vocals (died 2014)
 Peter Taylor – lead vocals/percussion (1993–1994)

Spin-off bands

The (New) Pirates (1976)
 Nick Simper – bass/vocals (1976)
 Roger "Truth" Pinner – drums (1976)

Kidd Kane & the Pirates (2005)
 Kidd Kane – vocals (2005)
 Joe Moretti Jnr – guitar (2005)
 Brian Gregg – bass (2005, original Pirates member)
 Clem Cattini – drums (2005, original Pirates member)

Johnny Spence & Doctors Order

Current members
 Johnny Spence – vocals (2008–present; original Pirates member)
 Teppo "Teddy Bear" Nättilä – bass/vocals (1998–present)
 Arto "Grande-Archie" Hämäläinen – guitar (1998–present)
 Kimmo "Mighty Man" Oikarinen – drums (2007–present)
(*Kaj Erik Ensio Takamäki – plays harmonica on all the albums)

Former members
 Timo "Madman" Väätäinen – drums (1998–2003)
 Harri "Dirty Harry" Tuominen – drums (2003–2007)

Discography

Singles
Johnny Kidd & the Pirates
 "Please Don't Touch" b/w "Growl" (May 1959) (His Master's Voice 45-POP 615)
 "If You Were the Only Girl in the World" b/w "Feelin'" (Dec 1959) (His Master's Voice 45-POP 674) (a-side credited to Johnny Kidd with Chorus and Orchestra)
 "You Got What It Takes" b/w "Longin' Lips" (Jan 1960) (His Master's Voice 45-POP 698)
 "Shakin' All Over" b/w "Yes Sir, That's My Baby" (Jun 1960) (His Master's Voice 45-POP 753)
 "Restless" b/w "Magic of Love" (Sep 1960) (His Master's Voice 45-POP 790)
 "Linda Lu" b/w "Let's Talk About Us" (Mar 1961) (His Master's Voice 45-POP 853)
 "Please Don't Bring Me Down" b/w "So What" (Sep 1961) (His Master's Voice 45-POP 919)
 "Hurry On Back to Love" b/w "I Want That" (Jan 1962) (His Master's Voice 45-POP 978) (both sides credited to Johnny Kidd with The Michael Sammes Singers and Orchestra)
 "A Shot of Rhythm and Blues" b/w "I Can Tell" (Nov 1962) (His Master's Voice 45-POP 1088)
 "I'll Never Get Over You" b/w "Then I Got Everything" (Jun 1963) (His Master's Voice POP 1173)
 "Hungry for Love" b/w "Ecstasy" (Nov 1963) (His Master's Voice POP 1228)
 "Always and Ever" b/w "Dr. Feelgood" (Apr 1964) (His Master's Voice POP 1269)
 "Jealous Girl" b/w "Shop Around" (Jun 1964) (His Master's Voice POP 1309)
 "Whole Lotta Woman" b/w "Your Cheatin' Heart" (Oct 1964) (His Master's Voice POP 1353)
 "The Birds and the Bees" b/w "Don't Make the Same Mistake As I Did" (Feb 1965) (His Master's Voice POP 1397)
 "Shakin' All Over" (New Recording) b/w "Gotta Travel On" (May 1965) (His Master's Voice POP 1424)
 "It's Gotta Be You" b/w "I Hate to Get Up in the Morning" (Apr 1966) (His Master's Voice POP-1520)
 "Send for That Girl" b/w "The Fool" (posthumous, Nov 1966) (His Master's Voice POP 1559)

Extended plays
Johnny Kidd & the Pirates
 'Shakin' All Over' EP: "Please Don't Touch" / "Shakin' All Over" b/w "Restless" / "You Got What It Takes" (Dec 1960) (His Master's Voice 7EG 8628)
 'Johnny Kidd' EP: "I'll Never Get Over You" / "Then I Got Everything" b/w "Hungry for Love" / "A Shot of Rhythm and Blues" (Dec 1963) (His Master's Voice 7EG 8834)

Singles
The Pirates
 "My Babe" b/w "Castin' My Spell" (Jan 1964) (His Master's Voice POP 1250)
 "Shades of Blue" b/w "Can't Understand" (Jul 1966) (Polydor 56712)
 "Sweet Love on My Mind" (Live) b/w "You Don't Own Me" / "Don't München It" (Sep 1977) (Warner Bros. K 17002)

Unreleased album
After the band's chart successes in 1963, a number of tracks were recorded in early 1964.  Not much is known about how far a Johnny Kidd album progressed.  Their then-current single release "Always and Ever" failed to get into the Top 40 and EMI, already handling a good number of successful acts, may have decided to progress it no further.  "Shop Around" was the only track released at the time, on the B-side of the "Jealous Girl" single (HMV POP 1309) in June 1964.  Others had to wait another twenty years before being released in mono and / or stereo on various compilation albums on the "See for Miles" label.

Notes and references

External links
 Johnny Kidd & The Pirates website
 Discography
 Official Pirates band site

Beat groups
English rock music groups
Musical groups from London
Musical groups established in 1959
1959 establishments in England
British rock and roll music groups
Musical groups disestablished in 1967